Seaboard is an unincorporated community and coal town located in Tazewell County, Virginia, United States. It was also known as Big Creek.

References

Unincorporated communities in Tazewell County, Virginia
Unincorporated communities in Virginia
Coal towns in Virginia